Der Proletarier ('The Proletarian') was a German language socialist weekly newspaper published from Chicago, the United States. It began publishing in mid-1853, and was the first German-language socialist organ in the city. The newspaper was an initiative of a small group of German socialists who had fled to the United States following the defeat of the 1848 revolution. Henry Rösch served as the editor of the Der Proletarier. J. Karlen was another of the key figures of the newspaper.

See also
German language newspapers in the United States

References

1853 establishments in Illinois
German-language newspapers published in Illinois
Defunct German-language newspapers published in the United States
Socialist newspapers
Defunct newspapers published in Chicago
Newspapers established in 1853